Alush Gavazaj (born 24 March 1995) is a Kosovan professional footballer who plays as a defensive midfielder for Kosovo Superleague club Malisheva.

Club career

Tirana
On 2 July 2014, Gavazaj joined Albanian Superliga side Tirana. On 1 October 2014, he made his debut with Tirana in a 2014–15 Albanian Cup first round match against Sopoti Librazhd after being named in the starting line-up.

Loan at Bylis Ballsh
On 2 February 2015, Gavazaj joined Albanian First Division side Bylis Ballsh, on a season-long loan.

Loan at Tërbuni Pukë
On 29 July 2015, Gavazaj joined Albanian Superliga side Tërbuni Pukë, on a season-long loan. On 23 August 2015, he made his debut with Tërbuni Pukë in a 2015–16 Albanian Superliga match against Tirana after being named in the starting line-up.

Korabi Peshkopi
On 2 September 2016, Gavazaj signed with the newly promoted team of Albanian Superliga side Korabi Peshkopi. On 28 September 2016, he made his debut with Korabi Peshkopi in a 2016–17 Albanian Cup first round match against Kamza after being named in the starting line-up.

International career
On 22 January 2018. Gavazaj received a call-up from Kosovo for the friendly match against Azerbaijan. The match however was cancelled two days later, which prolonged his debut.

References

External links

Alush Gavazaj at the FSHF

1995 births
Living people
People from Prizren
Kosovo Albanians
Kosovan footballers
Kosovan expatriate footballers
Association football midfielders
KF Tirana players
KF Bylis Ballsh players
KF Tërbuni Pukë players
KF Korabi Peshkopi players
KF Liria players
KF Feronikeli players
FK Renova players
KF Vëllaznimi players
Kategoria Superiore players
Kategoria e Parë players
Football Superleague of Kosovo players
Kosovan expatriate sportspeople in North Macedonia
Expatriate footballers in North Macedonia